"Serve the People" is a political slogan which first appeared in Mao-era China, and the motto of the Chinese Communist Party (CCP). It originates from the title of a speech by Mao Zedong, delivered on 8 September 1944. The slogan also became very popular in the United States due to the strong Maoist influence on the New Left, especially among the Red Guard Party, the Black Panther Party and the Yellow Brotherhood of West Los Angeles.

Origins 
Mao Zedong wrote this speech to commemorate the death of a PLA soldier, Zhang Side, a participant in the Long March who died in the collapse of a kiln when he worked in Yan'an. In the speech, he quoted a phrase written by the famous Han Dynasty historian Sima Qian: "Though death befalls all men alike, it may be heavy as Mount Tai or light as a feather" (人固有一死，或轻于鸿毛，或重于泰山). Mao continued: "To die for the people is weightier than Mount Tai, but to work for the fascists and die for the exploiters and oppressors is lighter than a feather. Comrade Zhang Side died for the people, and his death is indeed weightier than Mount Tai".

The concept of "Serving the People", together with other slogans such as "Never benefit oneself, always benefit others" and "Tireless struggle" became core principles of the CCP.

Role during the Cultural Revolution 
During the Cultural Revolution, the speech was widely read. Chinese Premier Zhou Enlai was frequently seen wearing a rectangular Chairman Mao badge emblazoned with the slogan "Serve the People" next to Mao Zedong's portrait.

Roles in modern society

Ceremonial role 
Although less often used in China today, the phrase still plays some important ceremonial roles. It is inscribed on the screen wall facing the front entrance of the Zhongnanhai compound, which houses the headquarters of the Central People's Government and the CCP.

Since 1984, during inspections of troops in the People's Liberation Army, the following ceremonial exchange is carried out:
 Inspecting official: "Hello, Comrades!"
 Troops: "Hello, Leader [or Chairman]!"
 Inspecting official: "Comrades, you have worked hard!"
 Troops: "[We] Serve the people!"

Cultural role 
In 2007, actress Cameron Diaz caused a minor controversy by carrying a bag with the "Serve the People" slogan in Chinese on a tour of Peru. Many Peruvians felt the bag to be a show of support for the Maoist movement Shining Path.

Writer Yan Lianke wrote a satirical novel set during the Cultural Revolution titled Serve the People about an affair between the wife of a military officer and a peasant soldier.

See also 
 Community service
 Public service
 Volunteerism

Notes

Further reading 
 Mao, Zedong (1944). "Serve the People". (Chinese language).
 Net, Xinhua (2004). "PLA garrison in Hong Kong to continue using "Serve the People" (in Chinese).

References 

Ideology of the Chinese Communist Party
National mottos
Political catchphrases